Sergey Rostislavovich Fokichev (born 4 February 1963 in Cherepovets) is a former Russian speed skater who represented the USSR at the 1984 Olympics of Sarajevo, where he won the 500 m. He trained at VSS Trud and later at the Armed Forces sports society in Moscow.

Fokichev was the first speedskater to break the 36 seconds barrier on the 500 meter outside of the then fastest track in Almaty. After the 1984 Olympics, Fokichev won both the 500 m races at the World Sprint Championships. He also competed at the 1988 Winter Olympics in Calgary, coming fourth in the 500 m.
He was awarded the Order of the Badge of Honor in 1984.

Personal records

References

External links
 
 Profile - Olympedia

1963 births
Olympic gold medalists for the Soviet Union
Olympic speed skaters of the Soviet Union
Speed skaters at the 1984 Winter Olympics
Speed skaters at the 1988 Winter Olympics
Soviet male speed skaters
Living people
People from Cherepovets
Olympic medalists in speed skating
Medalists at the 1984 Winter Olympics
Russian male speed skaters
Sportspeople from Vologda Oblast